Neurochirurgie is a bimonthly peer-reviewed medical journal covering all aspects of neurosurgery. It was established in 1955 and is published by Elsevier. The editor-in-chief is Pierre-Hugues Roche (Aix-Marseille University).

Abstracting and indexing
The journal is abstracted and indexed in:
Current Contents/Clinical Medicine
Embase
Index Medicus/MEDLINE/PubMed
PASCAL
Science Citation Index Expanded
Scopus
According to the Journal Citation Reports, the journal has a 2017 impact factor of 0.702.

References

External links

Neurosurgery journals
Bimonthly journals
Multilingual journals
English-language journals
French-language journals
Elsevier academic journals
Publications established in 1955